Ramon Berenguer III the Great was the count of Barcelona, Girona, and Ausona from 1086 (jointly with Berenguer Ramon II and solely from 1097), Besalú from 1111, Cerdanya from 1117, and count of Provence in the Holy Roman Empire, from 1112, all until his death in Barcelona in 1131. As Ramon Berenguer I, he was Count of Provence in right of his wife.

Biography
Born on 11 November 1082 in Rodez, Viscounty of Rodez, County of Toulouse, Francia, he was the son of Ramon Berenguer II. He succeeded his father to co-rule with his uncle Berenguer Ramon II. He became the sole ruler in 1097, when Berenguer Ramon II was forced into exile. 

Responding to increased raids into his lands by the Almoravids in 1102, Ramon counter-attacked, assisted by Ermengol V, Count of Urgell, but was defeated and Ermengol killed at the battle of Mollerussa.

During his rule Catalan interests were extended on both sides of the Pyrenees. By marriage or vassalage he incorporated into his realm almost all of the Catalan counties (except Urgell and Peralada). He inherited the counties of Besalú (1111) and Cerdanya (1117) and in between married Douce, heiress of Provence (1112). His dominions then stretched as far east as Nice.

In alliance with the Count of Urgell, Ramon Berenguer conquered Barbastro and Balaguer. He also established relations with the Italian maritime republics of Pisa and Genoa, and in 1114 and 1115 attacked with Pisa the then-Muslim islands of Majorca and Ibiza. They became his tributaries and many Christian slaves there were recovered and set free. Ramon Berenguer also raided mainland Muslim dependencies with Pisa's help, such as Valencia, Lleida and Tortosa. In 1116, Ramon traveled to Rome to petition Pope Paschal II for a crusade to liberate Tarragona. By 1118 he had captured and rebuilt Tarragona, which became the metropolitan seat of the church in Catalonia (before that, Catalans had depended ecclesiastically on the archbishopric of Narbonne).

In 1127, Ramon Berenguer signed a commercial treaty with the Genoese. On July 14, 1130, toward the end of his life, he became an associate member of the Templars. He gave his five Catalan counties to his eldest son Ramon Berenguer IV and Provence to the younger son Berenguer Ramon. 

He died on 23 January/19 July 1131 and was buried in the Santa Maria de Ripoll monastery.

Marriages and descendants

 Ramon's first wife was María Rodríguez de Vivar, second daughter of El Cid (died ca. 1105). They had one child. 
 María, married Bernat III, Count of Besalú (died 1111) 
 His second wife Almodis produced no children.
 His third wife was Douce (Dolça de Gévaudaun), heiress of Provence (died ca. 1127).  Their union produced at least seven children: 
 Ramon Berenguer IV, Count of Barcelona (1113/1114–1162) married Petronilla of Aragon, daughter of Ramiro II, King of Aragón
 Berenguer Ramon I, Count of Provence (ca. 1115–1144)
 Bernat, died young 
 Berenguela or Berengaria (1116–1149), married Alfonso VII of Castile
 Jimena (1117–1136), also known as Eixemena, married Roger III, Count of Foix
 Estefania (b. 1118), married Centule II, Count of Bigorre
 Almodis, married Ponce de Cervera, mother of Agalbursa, who married Barisone II of Arborea.

References

Sources

Counts of Barcelona
Counts of Provence
People from Rodez
1082 births
1131 deaths
Burials at Santa Maria de Ripoll
Christians of the 1113–1115 Balearic Islands expedition
House of Barcelona
11th-century French people
12th-century French people
11th-century people from the County of Barcelona
12th-century people from the County of Barcelona